Joanna Natalia Jabłczyńska (born 9 December 1985 in Warsaw, Poland) is a Polish actress and singer. Joanna is singer, lawyer, legal advisor, ambassador of many charity actions (especially for children), initially a presenter of youth programs.

Education
She is a graduate of the Miguel de Cervantes Liceum in Warsaw.

Discography
 Papparapa (2010)

Filmography

 Trzy szalone zera – Ola Obrębska
 Wyrok na Franciszka Kłosa – Józia
 Duża przerwa – Student
 Słoneczna włócznia – Dora Parnel
 Powiedz to, Gabi – Gośka
 Na Wspólnej – Marta Konarska (née Hoffer)
 Nigdy w życiu! – Tosia
 Kto nigdy nie żył... – Marysia
 Tylko mnie kochaj – Waitress
 Nadzieja
 Dlaczego nie! – Moni
 Klan – Sylwia Marczyńska
 Niania – Nicole's manager
 Kryminalni – Ula (episode 98)
 Taniec z gwiazdami – Herself
 Jak oni śpiewają – Herself

Polish dubbing
Video games

 Battlefield 4
 Disciples III: Renaissance – Various voices
 Dragon Age: Origins – Awakening – Sorcha / Additional voices
 Legend: Hand of God – Luna
 Mass Effect 2 – Gabriella Daniels
 Neverwinter Nights 2 – Neeshka
 Scooby-Doo! First Frights – Anna

Movies

 7 Dwarves – Men Alone in the Wood – Snow White
 A Bug's Life
 A Troll in Central Park – Rosie
 Babar: The Movie – Isabelle
 Barbie Fairytopia: Magic of the Rainbow
 Camp Rock series – Tess Tyler
 Chicken Little
 Dr. Seuss' How the Grinch Stole Christmas – Cindy Lou Who
 Franklin and the Turtle Lake Treasure – Franklin
 Garfield's Fun Fest – Arlene
 Harry Potter and the Philosopher's Stone
 Impy's Island – Wutz
 Lady and the Tramp II: Scamp's Adventure
 Lissi und der wilde Kaiser – Granny
 Monster House – Jenny
 NASCAR 3D: The IMAX Experience – Kim / Additional voices
 Over the Hedge – Heather
 Peter Pan – Wendy
 Planet 51
 Planet Terror – Dakota Block 
 Pokémon: The Movie 2000 – Melody
 Return to Never Land Young Wendy
 Sokoliar Tomáš/Król sokołów – Agata
 Spirited Away – Chihiro Ogino
 Spy Kids series – Carmen Cortez
 The Adventures of Sharkboy and Lavagirl in 3-D – Lava
 The Lion King II: Simba's Pride – Young Kiara
 The Little Mermaid II: Return to the Sea – Melody
 The Secret of Moonacre – Maria Merryweather
 The Wild Thornberrys Movie – Eliza Thornberry
 Zathura: A Space Adventure – Lisa

TV series

 64 Zoo Lane – Lucy
 Avatar: The Last Airbender – Princess Yue
 Babar – Isabelle
 Foeksia de Miniheks – Foeksia
 Girlstuff/Boystuff – Talia
 Goosebumps – Various voices
 Jacob Two-Two – Emma
 ¡Mucha Lucha! – Buena Girl
 PB&J Otter Rolie Polie Olie – Zowie Polie 
 Sabrina: The Animated Series – Sabrina Spellman
 Talespin – Molly Cunningham (2nd voice, 1st Polish dub)
 That's So Raven The Little Lulu Show – Lulu
 The Magic School Bus'' – Wanda Li

References

1985 births
Polish actresses
Polish film actresses
Polish television actresses
Polish child actresses
Polish voice actresses
Polish women singers
Living people
Polish pop singers
21st-century Polish singers
21st-century Polish women singers
Actresses from Warsaw